Ilgar Hasanov (born 1964) is an artist, musician, composer, and actor. He acts in both movies and on stage and has experience as both a performer and teacher. He graduated from Gerasimov Institute of Cinematography (VGIK) in Moscow, Russia and played leading roles, co-leads, and secondary leading roles in many plays in the Azerbaijani State Theater of the Young Spectators, Russian Drama Theater, Academic Opera and Ballet Theater, and many others.

In 1989, Ilgar Hasanov played the leading role in Jahangir Zeynalli's film, Elaqe, the first psychological sci-fi film in Azerbaijan. His filmography includes Contact (1989), Circle (1989), Opposition, Through the Eyes of a Ghost (2010) (Watch on YouTube), Karabakhname, Babu (2013) (Watch on YouTube), and Victims of Love "Məhəbbət Qurbanları" (2017). He also acted in episodic roles on television series in Turkey, Azerbaijan, and other countries. Additionally, he is a member of the Finnish Composers' Copyright Society through Teosto and has partnered with Lasse Heikkilä, a Finnish composer, in the past. Ilgar Hasanov has also composed many praise and worship songs which are incorporated in services at Greater Grace churches around the world.

Ilgar Hasanov was admitted to the Faculty of Cinematography at the University of Cinematography in Moscow. He studied in the class of the prominent actor Aleksey Batalov. During his student years, Ilgar Hasanov was very active. After graduating from university, he returned to Baku. He performed in mass and episodic scenes first in the Azerbaijani State Theater of the Young Spectators, then Russian Drama Theater, learning the subtleties and intricacies of this field from well-known stage luminaries. In 1988, at the suggestion of film director Jahangir Zeynalli, he starred in the film Contact. The film is based on Anar Rzayev's novel "Contact".

Ilgar Hasanov, in an interview, said, "I play every role on stage with emotion and passion, I live the character, I try to convey to the audience the psychological state of the protagonist, which worries me a lot in life."

Performances 

Ilgar Hasanov played the role of Alyosha in "The Brothers Karamazov" at Russian Drama Theater in Baku, Azerbaijan, in 2010.

References 

1964 births
Living people